Protein Dom3Z is a protein that in humans is encoded by the DOM3Z gene.

This gene localizes to the major histocompatibility complex (MHC) class III region on chromosome 6. The function of its protein product is unknown, but its ubiquitous expression and conservation in both simple and complex eukaryotes suggests that this may be a housekeeping gene.

References

Further reading